Thierry Mandon (born 30 December 1957) is a French politician, a member of the Socialist Party, representative of the ninth constituency of Essonne from 1988 to 1993 and from 2012 to 2014, and speaker for the Socialist group at the National Assembly until his nomination in the government. He was also Mayor of Ris-Orangis between 1995 and 2012. On 3 June 2012, he was appointed Secretary of State for Public accounts and State reform in the First Valls Government. On 17 June 2015, he changed responsibilities, and became Secretary of State for Higher Education and Research in the Second Valls Government.

References

1957 births
Living people
Socialist Party (France) politicians
Mayors of places in Île-de-France
Sciences Po alumni
Deputies of the 14th National Assembly of the French Fifth Republic
Secretaries of State of France
People from Lausanne